South Oroville is a census-designated place (CDP) in Butte County, California, United States. The population was 5,742 at the 2010 census, down from 7,695 at the 2000 census.

For all practical purposes, South Oroville is tied to Oroville proper. South Oroville contains a negligible number of businesses, and all residents are dependent on the commercial centers of Oroville, and sometimes Chico if they choose. In fact, there is no clear divide between South Oroville and the Oroville city limits. This also applies to Thermalito, Oroville East, and Palermo. Las Plumas High School is located in South Oroville, and most high school students go to school there.

Geography

According to the United States Census Bureau, the CDP has a total area of 3.0 square miles (7.7 km), all of it land.

Demographics

2010
The 2010 United States Census reported that South Oroville had a population of 5,742. The racial makeup of South Oroville was 3,407 (59.3%) White, 406 (7.1%) African American, 245 (4.3%) Native American, 885 (15.4%) Asian, 9 (0.2%) Pacific Islander, 361 (6.3%) from other races, and 429 (7.5%) from two or more races. Hispanic or Latino of any race were 851 persons (14.8%).

The Census reported that 5,624 people (97.9% of the population) lived in households, 118 (2.1%) lived in non-institutionalized group quarters, and 0 (0%) were institutionalized.

There were 1,745 households, out of which 771 (44.2%) had children under the age of 18 living in them, 701 (40.2%) were opposite-sex married couples living together, 390 (22.3%) had a female householder with no husband present, 148 (8.5%) had a male householder with no wife present.  There were 172 (9.9%) unmarried opposite-sex partnerships, and 11 (0.6%) same-sex married couples or partnerships. 354 households (20.3%) were made up of individuals, and 101 (5.8%) had someone living alone who was 65 years of age or older. The average household size was 3.22.  There were 1,239 families (71.0% of all households); the average family size was 3.72.

The population was spread out, with 1,759 people (30.6%) under the age of 18, 685 people (11.9%) aged 18 to 24, 1,453 people (25.3%) aged 25 to 44, 1,382 people (24.1%) aged 45 to 64, and 463 people (8.1%) who were 65 years of age or older.  The median age was 30.0 years. For every 100 females, there were 100.9 males.  For every 100 females age 18 and over, there were 96.5 males.

The homeowner vacancy rate was 3.1%; the rental vacancy rate was 8.1%.  2,539 people (44.2% of the population) lived in owner-occupied housing units and 3,085 people (53.7%) lived in rental housing units.

2000
As of the census of 2000, there were 7,695 people, 2,491 households, and 1,771 families residing in the CDP. The racial makeup of the CDP was 69.06% White, 4.87% Black or African American, 3.98% Native American, 12.74% Asian, 0.05% Pacific Islander, 3.78% from other races, and 5.52% from two or more races.  9.99% of the population were Hispanic or Latino of any race.

There were 2,491 households, out of which 37.7% had children under the age of 18 living with them, 46.2% were married couples living together, 19.2% had a female householder with no husband present, and 28.9% were non-families. 22.6% of all households were made up of individuals, and 11.0% had someone living alone who was 65 years of age or older.  The average household size was 3.05 and the average family size was 3.60.

In the CDP, the population was spread out, with 35.1% under the age of 18, 8.8% from 18 to 24, 24.1% from 25 to 44, 19.6% from 45 to 64, and 12.4% who were 65 years of age or older.  The median age was 31 years. For every 100 females, there were 93.7 males.  For every 100 females age 18 and over, there were 84.9 males.

The median income for a household in the CDP was $23,783, and the median income for a family was $28,073. Males had a median income of $27,162 versus $20,547 for females. The per capita income for the CDP was $9,823.  About 25.6% of families and 34.8% of the population were below the poverty line, including 47.8% of those under age 18 and 9.6% of those age 65 or over.

Annexation 
The City of Oroville recently annexed two parts of South Oroville, consisting of Area A and B. Together, they have a combined population of 2,725 people. Area A has a population of 2,392 people and Area B's population is 333 people. Area A is an urbanized area and fairly regular in shape. It is located south of Wyandotte Avenue and is bounded on the west by Lincoln Blvd., Ithaca Street comprises the southern boundary, and Area B comprises the eastern boundary. Area B is more rural in character. It consists of larger undeveloped or under-developed parcels. Area B is bounded by Area A to the west, Lower Wyandotte Road to the North East, the current City limit to the east, and V-7 Road and Oro Garden Ranch Road to the South.

References

Census-designated places in Butte County, California
Census-designated places in California